Michigan Center Jr/Sr High School is a public secondary school in Leoni Township, Michigan Center, Michigan, United States.

Demographics
The demographic breakdown of the 602 students enrolled in 2021-22 was:
Male - 53.98%
Female - 46.01%
Asian - 0.6%
Black - 1.3%
Hispanic - 3.6%
White - 88.2%
Multiracial - 6.1%

Sports History

Michigan Center plays in the Cascade Conference, which includes schools in and around the Jackson Area. Schools included in the Cascade Conference are as follows:

Current Conference Members

Addison High School

East Jackson High School

Grass Lake High School

Hanover-Horton High School

Manchester High School

Michigan Center Jr/Sr High School

Napoleon High School

Vandercook Lake High School

Joining the Cascade Conference at the start of the 2023-24 School Year

Columbia Central High School

Homer High School

Jonesville High School

Leslie High School

Conference Championships:

Football: 21x Conference Champions

Boys' Basketball: 18x Conference Champions

Baseball: 29x Conference Champions

Boys' Track: 13x Conference Champions

Girls' Track: 3x Conference Champions

Girls' Basketball: 15x Conference Champion

Girls' Golf: 2x Conference Champions

Softball: 9x Conference Champions

Wrestling: 3x Conference Champions

Boys' Cross Country: 4x Conference Champions

Girls' Cross Country: 3x Conference Champions

Boys' Golf: 4x Conference Champions

Cheerleading: 11x Conference Champions

Volleyball: 2010 Conference Champions

District Championships:

Football: 2x District Champions

Boys' Basketball: 11x District Champions

Baseball: 12x District Champions

 Girls' Basketball: 19x District Champions

Softball: 9x District Champions

Volleyball: 2x District Champions

Wrestling: 8x District Champions

Cheerleading: 2x District Champions

Boys' Soccer: 2021 District ChampionsRegional Championships:Baseball: 3x Regional Champions

Boys' Basketball: 2x  Champions

Boys' Golf: 2x Regional Champions

Cheerleading: 3x Regional Champions

Football: 2021 Regional Champions

Girls' Basketball: 6x Regional Champions

Girls' Golf: 2020 Regional Champions

Wrestling: 1992 Regional Champions

Boys' Cross Country: 1975 Regional ChampionsState Runner-Up:Girls' Basketball: 2x State Runner-Up(2003, 2005)

Baseball: 2006 State Runner-UpState Championships:

Football: 1936 State Champions

 Boys' Basketball: 1945 State Champions

Cheerleading: 5x State Champions(2009, 2011, 2012, 2013, 2014)

References

External links

Public high schools in Michigan
Schools in Jackson County, Michigan